The 2011 AFL draft consisted of five opportunities for player acquisitions during the 2011/12 Australian Football League off-season.

These were:
2011 trade week; which was held between 10 October and 17 October
A mini-draft of 17-year-old players, as part of the recruitment concessions given to the newly established Greater Western Sydney Giants, which was held on 13 October
The 2011 national draft; which was held on 24 November in Sydney.
The 2012 pre-season draft, held on 13 December 2011 and
The 2012 rookie draft, also on 13 December 2011.

It was the first national draft to feature the Greater Western Sydney Giants, who joined the league in 2012. It was the final draft period before the introduction of free agency in the 2012/13 offseason.

Greater Western Sydney concessions
The Greater Western Sydney Giants were to join the AFL in 2012, and were provided with several draft concessions, including additional draft selections, early access to recruit 17-year-old players, and access to uncontracted and previously listed players in this offseason. These concessions were similar to those provided to the Gold Coast Football Club, which entered the league in the previous season.

Greater Western Sydney was permitted to recruit the following players directly, without the need for any draft:
At the end of 2010, up to twelve 17-year-old players (born between 1 January – 30 April 1993), who were too young to enter the 2010 AFL draft. These players were not eligible to play senior AFL football in 2011, and would continue to undergo junior development, either in Sydney or their home state.
Up to ten players who were not on an AFL list but had previously nominated for a national draft. These players could be recruited at the end of either 2011 or 2012, with no more than ten players recruited in this manner over the two years. Greater Western Sydney could immediately trade any players recruited in this manner.
Up to sixteen players who were on an AFL list, but were out of contract at the end of the season. Again, these players could be recruited at the end of either 2011 or 2012, with no more than sixteen players recruited in this manner over the two years, and no more than one player recruited from any other club. Clubs who lost players in this manner received compensatory selections in the national draft; the number and value of these selections was determined based on age, contract size, on-field performance and draft order, and were permitted to be used in any year between 2011 and 2015.
Up to sixteen players recruited from the New South Wales and Australian Capital Territory zone, recruited at any time between 2010 and 2013, and from the Northern Territory zone, recruited between 2011 and 2013.

Then, in the drafts, Greater Western Sydney had the following selections:
In the 2011 national draft, the first selection in each round, and picks No. 2, 3, 5, 7, 9, 11, 13 and 15 in the first round.
In the 2011 rookie draft, the first eight selections.
In the 2012 rookie draft, the first selection in each round.

Additionally, at the end of 2011, Greater Western Sydney had the ability to trade the only four selections in a once-off "mini-draft", which could be used to recruit 17-year-old players (born between 1 January – 30 April 1994). Greater Western Sydney could only use these draft picks as trade currency; the club was not permitted to use the picks for its own list development. Players recruited and traded in this manner were not eligible to play senior AFL football in 2012, and would continue to undergo junior development. This specific concession was unique to Greater Western Sydney; Gold Coast did not have the same concession the previous year.

Greater Western Sydney began with an expanded list size of up to fifty senior players and nine rookies, to be gradually reduced to a standard list size of thirty-eight senior players and nine rookies by 2019.

During the 2011 AFL season there was speculation about several players who would be uncontracted at the end of the season, including Tom Scully, Rhys Palmer, Callan Ward and Taylor Walker. After the season had ended, Palmer, Scully and Ward also announced moves to the Giants. As compensation, Scully was rated as a top-level player, resulting in  receiving both a first-round and a mid-first round draft pick as compensation. Davis and Ward were rated as second-level, earning  and  a first round compensation selection, and Palmer was rated a third-level player, giving  an end of first round selection.

Player movements

Trades
In the lead up to trade week, the requests of players to move back to their home states dominated most trade rumours. Mitch Clark, Leon Davis, Brad Ebert and Jack Gunston all requested to be traded back to teams in their states of origin.

Early in trade week, many trades involved unlisted players being recruited directly by Greater Western Sydney under the club's concessions, then immediately traded. Where this has occurred, the club from which GWS recruited the player is shown in parentheses after his name.

Note: the numbering of the draft picks in this trades table is based on the original order prior to draft day. The final numbering of many of these draft picks was adjusted on draft day due to either the insertion of compensation draft picks in the early rounds, or clubs passing in the later rounds.

Retirements and delistings

Mini-draft
As part of their entry concessions, Greater Western Sydney was allocated up to four selections in a mini-draft, which could be used to recruit seventeen-year-old players who otherwise would not be eligible for the 2011 National Draft, but who could not play senior AFL football until the 2013 season. Greater Western Sydney were not permitted to use these draft picks directly, but had to trade them to other clubs. In 2011, Gold Coast and Adelaide secured trades with GWS for selections in this draft, leaving two selections remaining for the 2012 AFL Draft.

2011 national draft
The 2011 AFL National Draft was held on 24 November in Sydney. It was the second time that the draft was held outside of Melbourne, after being held at the Gold Coast in 2010.

Prior to the draft, three players were selected under the Father-Son Rule. Buckley and Bews were secured with no rival clubs submitting bids, allowing Carlton and Geelong to each use its final draft selection for the father-son pick.   submitted a first round bid for Mitchell, which Sydney was able to match, so, Mitchell was drafted with the 21st selection in the draft.

Notes

2012 pre-season draft
The 2012 AFL pre-season draft was held on 13 December 2011. Zac Dawson, Leon Davis and John McCarthy were considered to be the delisted AFL players most likely to be selected.  The changes to the list rules to allow mature age players to be rookie listed has also resulted in less preseason draft selections.

2012 rookie draft

Selections by league
Draft selection totals by leagues:

References

Australian Football League draft
Draft
AFL Draft
2010s in Sydney
Australian rules football in New South Wales
Sport in Sydney
Events in Sydney